Gifty Ayew Asare (born 9 June 1998) is a Ghanaian footballer who plays as a striker. In 2018, she was called up to play for the Black Queens, the Ghana women's national football team, after netting 27 goals in 19 matches for Northern Oklahoma College's Lady Maverick F.C Soccer Team.

Early life and education 
Gifty was born to in Accra. She attended Assin Manso Senior High School, Asuanse Technical Institute and completed Blessed Tutorial College for her second cycle education. She continued to study Health, Physical Education, and Recreation at the Northern Oklahoma College.

Club career 
Gifty started her football career playing for PSK Soccer Queens Academy in Komenda. She joined Bafana Ladies (now Sealions FC) from 2011 to 2013 before moving to Samaria Ladies in Lapaz. She later joined Blessed Ladies FC in the Ghana Women's Premier League in the 2014/2015 season.

In 2016, she gained a scholarship to further her education at the Northern Oklahoma College, where she played for the school's women soccer team, Lady Maverick F.C and won the Most Valuable Player Award in 2017. She was also shortlisted for the All-American Third Team in their 2017 NJCAA Division One Women's League.

In 2017, she become the first professional footballer to take part in the Miss Ghana USA.

International career 
In 2014 she was assigned her first national duty to play for the Black Maidens ahead of the U17 World Cup hosted in Costa Rica but did not make the cut. In 2017 she was called up by the then Black Queens coach Dramani Mas-Ud Didi in his 28-member provisional squad for camping ahead of an international friendly against France on October 23 in Paris.

Honours 

 6 times M.V.P: 2015–16 National 'D'1 League– Ghana
 2017–18 NJCAA Women's Soccer (all-American selected 3rd team) – U.S.A

References

External links 
https://www.nocmavs.com/sports/wsoc/2017-18/bios/ayew_asare_gifty_y0gl
https://stats.njcaa.org/sports/wsoc/2016-17/div1/players/giftyayewasareh83d

1998 births
Living people
Ghana women's international footballers
Ghanaian expatriate women's footballers
Ghanaian women's footballers
Footballers from Accra
Women's association football forwards